Four Oaks is a town in Johnston County, North Carolina, United States. As of the 2010 census it had a population of 1,921, up from 1,424 in 2000.

History
Four Oaks was one of several towns founded along a branch of the Wilmington and Weldon Railroad, completed though Johnston County in 1886.

Four Oaks—named for four oak tree sprouts growing from a stump—incorporated in 1889, and at that time had a post office, a public gin, saw and grist mills, a saloon and general store, a church, and a population of 25.   Cotton and tobacco farming were notable industries in the surrounding community.

A brick school for white students opened in 1923. By the 1930s, several rural schools near Four Oaks consolidated, and enrollment at the brick school increased to over 1,900 students, after which the school claimed to be the world's "largest rural consolidated school". An arsonist destroyed the building in 1987. An elementary school for black students opened in 1928.

Street lights were installed in 1907, and by 1910 Four Oaks had a population of 329.

The Four Oaks Commercial Historic District was listed on the National Register of Historic Places in 2006.

Geography
Four Oaks is in central Johnston County, southwest of Smithfield, the county seat. The town limits extend northeast to Holts Lake on Black Creek, a tributary of the Neuse River. U.S. Route 301 (Wellons Street) is the main road through the town, leading northeast  to Smithfield and southwest  to Benson. Interstate 95, running parallel to US 301, passes the southeast corner of Four Oaks, with access from Exit 87.

Demographics

As of the census of 2000, there were 1,424 people, 614 households, and 386 families residing in the town. The population density was 1,341.5 people per square mile (518.7/km2). There were 667 housing units at an average density of 628.4 per square mile (243.0/km2). The racial makeup of the town was 78.23% White, 16.22% African American, 0.63% Native American, 0.14% Asian, 3.72% from other races, and 1.05% from two or more races. Hispanic or Latino of any race were 7.65% of the population. The oldest living person in Four Oaks is 96 years old.

There were 614 households, out of which 30.3% had children under the age of 18 living with them, 44.3% were married couples living together, 15.3% had a female householder with no husband present, and 37.1% were non-families. 32.6% of all households were made up of individuals, and 14.8% had someone living alone who was 65 years of age or older. The average household size was 2.32 and the average family size was 2.91.

In the town, the population was spread out, with 24.6% under the age of 18, 8.4% from 18 to 24, 28.1% from 25 to 44, 23.7% from 45 to 64, and 15.2% who were 65 years of age or older. The median age was 37 years. For every 100 females, there were 83.7 males. For every 100 females age 18 and over, there were 78.4 males.

The median income for a household in the town was $29,427, and the median income for a family was $41,875. Males had a median income of $31,875 versus $25,444 for females. The per capita income for the town was $17,473. About 12.8% of families and 17.5% of the population were below the poverty line, including 23.0% of those under age 18 and 21.1% of those age 65 or over.

Arts and culture
The Four Oaks Acorn Festival features live entertainment, vendors, children's activities, a barbecue competition, and an antique car and tractor show.

Education
 Four Oaks Elementary School
 Four Oaks Middle School
 South Johnston High School

References

External links

 
 Four Oaks-Benson News in Review
 Four Oaks visitor info at Johnston County Visitors Bureau

Towns in Johnston County, North Carolina
Towns in North Carolina
1886 establishments in North Carolina